The Walls of Vejer de la Frontera (Spanish: Murallas de Vejer de la Frontera) refers to the town walls of Vejer de la Frontera, Spain. Constructed for defensive purposes, the walls were declared Bien de Interés Cultural in 1993.

References 

Bien de Interés Cultural landmarks in the Province of Cádiz
Vejer de la Frontera